Alexandru Ioan Cuza National College may refer to one of three educational institutions in Romania:

Alexandru Ioan Cuza National College (Focșani)
Alexandru Ioan Cuza National College (Galați)
Alexandru Ioan Cuza National College (Ploiești)